The 1968 United States presidential election in Ohio took place on November 5, 1968. All 50 states and The District of Columbia were part of the 1968 United States presidential election. Ohio voters chose 26 electors to the Electoral College, who voted for president and vice president.

Ohio was won by the Republican Party candidate, former Vice President Richard Nixon by a narrow margin of 2.28%. Nixon won the vast majority of Ohio’s counties, including the major cities of Columbus, Cincinnati, Canton and Hamilton. The Democratic Party candidate, Vice President Hubert Humphrey, kept the race close by winning the major cities of Cleveland, Toledo, Akron, Dayton, Youngstown, Lorain, and Springfield.

The American Independent Party candidate, former Alabama governor George Wallace, had his best performance in the Midwestern United States, taking 11.81% of the popular vote, despite being far from his base of support in the Deep South. This was due to Ohio's presence along the borders of Kentucky and West Virginia, which are considered part of the southern United States. In the north, Wallace appealed to blue-collar workers and union members who usually voted Democratic, but who had become disgruntled with the racial violence and anti-Vietnam War protests. As a result, this split in the Democratic vote between Humphrey and Wallace was enough for Nixon to narrowly carry Ohio.

, this is the last election in which Mercer County voted for a Democratic presidential candidate.

Results

Results by county

See also
 United States presidential elections in Ohio

Notes

References

Ohio
1968
1968 Ohio elections